The Diadematoida are an order of sea urchins. They are distinguished from other sea urchins by the fact that their spines are hollow, or at best have an open mesh at the core, and by the presence of 10 buccal plates around the mouth. Their tests can be either solid or flexible.

Taxonomy

References
 
 

 
Extant Early Jurassic first appearances